George J. Mathew  (born 3 August 1939) is an Indian politician and a senior Congress leader from the Kottayam district who served as a Member of Legislative Assembly from Kanjirappally from 1991 to 2006 as well as a former Lok Sabha member.

Early life and education 
Mr. George was born on August 3, 1939, to K. V. Mathew and Thresyamma Mathew in a village known as "Koottickal" of the Kanjirapalli taluk within the Kottayam district. He attended the Bangalore European School as well as the Madras Loyola College. His highest qualification is a Bachelor's degree, of a Bachelor of Science (BSc).

Political career 
Mr. George, who started his political career as a Congress worker, joined the party Kerala Congress in 1964 when it was formed, but later left the Kerala Congress in 1983 and returned to its parent party, the Indian National Congress, after the splits in the party continued. From 1977 to 1980, he was elected as a member of the Lok Sabha from Muvattupuzha constituency. From 1991 to 2006, he was a Member of Legislative Assembly from Kanjirapally for 15 consecutive years.

Political Roles

 1971-1978: Treasurer, Kerala
 1977-1980: Member of Lok Sabha, Muvattupuzha
 1977-1979: Kerala Congress, Parliamentary Party Leader, Lok Sabha
 1980-1983: Chairman, Kerala Congress
 1983: Return to the Congress party
 1991–1996, 1996–2001, 2001–2006: Member of Legislative Assembly, Kanjirapally.

Other Designations

 2003 Director, Rashtra Deepika
 Chairman & MD, State Spices and Leaf Supply Company
 Member of Plantations Labor Committee, Rubber Board, Kanjirapally Rotary Club
 Book Written : "Anubhavangal Adiyozhukkukal"

Private Life 

 Wife: Meera George
 Children: 3 Sons and 1 Daughter

Elections Participated in

References 

1939 births
Kerala MLAs 2001–2006
Indian politicians
India MPs 1977–1979
Kerala MLAs 1991–1996
Kerala MLAs 1996–2001
Living people